Pseudaletis jolyana is a butterfly in the family Lycaenidae. It is found in Ghana.

References

Endemic fauna of Ghana
Butterflies described in 2007
Pseudaletis